William D. Coleman is a Canadian political scientist currently at University of Waterloo, having been the IGI Chair and University Distinguished Professor at McMaster University.

References

Academic staff of the University of Waterloo
Academic staff of McMaster University
Canadian political scientists
Year of birth missing (living people)
Living people